The Internationaux du Doubs – Open de Franche-Comté was a professional tennis tournament played on indoor hard courts. It was part of the ATP Challenger Series (renamed the ATP Challenger Tour in 2009). It was held annually in Thise near Besançon, France, as a Satellite from 1996 to 1998 and as a Challenger from 1999 until 2009. In 2010 was cancelled due to budget reasons.

There are three title holders, each with two doubles titles, Lionel Barthez, Christopher Kas and Philipp Petzschner. Only one player, Julien Boutter, won both singles and doubles titles the same year.

Past finals

Singles

Doubles

External links
Official website
ITF Search 

ATP Challenger Tour
Hard court tennis tournaments
Tennis tournaments in France
Defunct tennis tournaments in France